Madagascar is a software package for multidimensional data analysis and reproducible computational experiments. Its mission is to provide
 a convenient and powerful environment
 a convenient technology transfer tool
for researchers working with digital image and data processing in geophysics and related fields. Technology developed using the Madagascar project management system is transferred in the form of recorded processing histories, which become "computational recipes" to be verified, exchanged, and modified by users of the system.

Features 
The Madagascar environment consists of:
 Standalone programs for out-of-core data analysis;
 Standalone programs for geophysical data processing and imaging;
 A development kit for C, C++, Java, Fortran-77, Fortran-90, Python, Matlab, and Octave;
 A framework for reproducible numerical experiments, based on SCons;
 A framework for scientific publications, based on SCons and LaTeX;
 A collection of reproducible scientific articles also used as usage examples and regression tests for the standalone programs;
 A collection of datasets used as input to reproducible numerical experiments.

Example script 
An example  file is shown below
from rsf.proj import *

Fetch('wz.35.H','wz')

Flow('wind','wz.35.H','dd form=native | window n1=400 j1=2 | smooth rect1=3')
Plot('wind','pow pow1=2 | grey')

Flow('mute','wind','mutter v0=0.31 half=n')
Plot('mute','pow pow1=2 | grey')

Result('denmark','wind mute','SideBySideAniso')

End()
Note that  by itself does not do any job other than setting rules for building different targets. The targets get built when one executes  on the command line. Running  produces
bash$ scons
scons: Reading SConscript files ...
scons: done reading SConscript files.
scons: Building targets ...
retrieve(["wz.35.H"], [])
< wz.35.H /RSF/bin/sfdd form=native | /RSF/bin/sfwindow n1=400 j1=2 | /RSF/bin/sfsmooth rect1=3 > wind.rsf
< wind.rsf /RSF/bin/sfpow pow1=2 | /RSF/bin/sfgrey > wind.vpl
< wind.rsf /RSF/bin/sfmutter v0=0.31 half=n > mute.rsf
< mute.rsf /RSF/bin/sfpow pow1=2 | /RSF/bin/sfgrey > mute.vpl
/RSF/bin/vppen yscale=2 vpstyle=n gridnum=2,1 wind.vpl mute.vpl > Fig/denmark.vpl
scons: done building targets.

License 

Madagascar is free software and is licensed under the GPL.

History 

Madagascar was first publicly presented at the EAGE Workshop in Vienna in June 2006. The work on the package (previously named RSF) was started by Sergey Fomel in 2003. Since then, many people have contributed to it.

While being written mostly from scratch, Madagascar borrows ideas from the design of SEPlib, an open-source package maintained by Bob Clapp at the Stanford Exploration Project (SEP). Generations of SEP students and researchers contributed to SEPlib. Most important contributions came from Rob Clayton, Jon Claerbout, Dave Hale, Stew Levin, Rick Ottolini, Joe Dellinger, Steve Cole, Dave Nichols, Martin Karrenbach, Biondo Biondi, and Bob Clapp.

Madagascar also borrows ideas from Seismic Unix (SU), a package maintained by John Stockwell at the Center for Wave Phenomenon (CWP) at the Colorado School of Mines (Stockwell, 1997; Stockwell, 1999). Main contributors to SU included Einar Kjartansson, Shuki Ronen, Jack Cohen, Chris Liner, Dave Hale, and John Stockwell. SU adopted an open-source BSD-style license starting with release 40 (April 10, 2007).

Madagascar Schools 

Madagascar Schools on Reproducible Computational Geophysics are annual events, where new users get introduced to the package, and project participants meet to discuss new developments.

Here is the list of previous schools:
 School and Workshop 2006, Vancouver, BC, Canada 
 Short Course 2007, Austin, TX, USA 
 Implementation Workshop 2008, Golden, CO, USA 
 School 2009, Delft, Netherlands, EU 
 School 2009, Salvador, Bahia, Brazil 
 School and Hands-On Workshop 2010, Houston, TX, USA 
 School 2011, Beijing, China 
 School 2012, Austin, TX, USA 
 Working Workshop 2013, Austin, TX, USA 
 School 2013, Melbourne, Australia 
 School 2014, Saint Petersburg, Russia 
 Working Workshop 2014, Houston, TX, USA 
 School 2015, Harbin, China 
 School for Advanced Users 2015, Qingdao, China 
 Working Workshop 2015, Houston, TX, USA 
 School 2016, Zürich, Switzerland 
 Working Workshop 2016, Houston, TX, USA 
 School 2017, Houston, TX, USA 
 Working Workshop 2017, Houston, TX, USA 
 School 2017, Shanghai, China 
 Working Workshop 2018, Houston, TX, USA 
 School 2020, Hefei, China

See also

 Reproducibility

References

External links 
 Madagascar homepage
 GitHub organization
 SourceForge project
 Scientific conference presentations about Madagascar
 For reproducible research, go to Madagascar
 Sergey Fomel and Jon Claerbout, Guest Editors' Introduction: Reproducible Research: Computing in Science and Engineering, vol. 11, no. 1, pp. 5–7, Jan./Feb. 2009, 
 Sergey Fomel, Paul Sava, Ioan Vlad, Yang Liu, and Vladimir Bashkardin, 2013, Madagascar: open-source software project for multidimensional data analysis and reproducible computational experiments: Journal of Open Research Software, 1(1):e8, 
 Sergey Fomel, Reproducible Research as a Community Effort: Lessons from the Madagascar Project: Computing in Science and Engineering, vol. 17, no. 1, pp. 20-26, Jan./Feb. 2015, 
 John Holden, The genesis of Madagascar: The Leading Edge, vol. 34, no. 11, Nov. 2015, 
Free science software